Duke of Kent is a title that has been created several times in the peerages of Great Britain and the United Kingdom, most recently as a royal dukedom for the fourth son of King George V. Since 1942, the title has been held by Prince Edward (born 1935), Queen Elizabeth II's cousin.

Earliest history
A title associated with Kent first appears anciently with the Kingdom of Kent (or Cantware), one of the seven Anglo-Saxon kingdoms that later merged to form the Kingdom of England. The Kings of Cantware (or Kent) date back to about 449. After 825, when the Kingdom of Kent was taken over by Egbert, King of Wessex, Kent became a dependency of Wessex and was ruled by sub-kings, usually related to the Wessex rulers. The titular kingship became something like the heir-apparent's title, as Aethelwulf, Egbert's son, became King of Kent in 825. By 860, Kent lost its status as a kingdom, becoming absorbed into Wessex.

Earls of Kent

The first title of Kent was that of the Earl of Kent in the Peerage of England. After the death of Godwin, Earl of Wessex, his son Leofwine (c. 1035–1066) became Earl of Kent sometime between 1056 and 1058.

After Leofwine's death at Hastings in 1066, William the Conqueror named his half-brother, Odo of Bayeux (c. 1036–1097), who was also Bishop of Bayeux, the new Earl of Kent. However, Odo was twice removed from this title. The first occasion was in 1082, when he was imprisoned; the second was in 1088, after aiding in the Rebellion of 1088, after which he fled England.

It was not until 1141 that the title returned, this time for William de Ipres; but he was deprived of the title in 1155. In 1227, it was revived for Hubert de Burgh, but became extinct with his death. In 1321, it was again revived for Edmund of Woodstock, and through the marriage of Joan Plantagenet to Thomas Holland, the title passed to the Holland family, which held the title until 1408. In 1461, it was revived for William Neville, and then in 1465 for Edmund Grey. The Grey family held the title until Henry Grey, 12th Earl of Kent, who was made Marquess of Kent in 1706 and Duke of Kent in 1710, died without male heirs in 1740. Just before he died, he was awarded an inferior replacement title of Marquess De Grey to allow this to be passed to his heir - his granddaughter (the Dukedom could not be inherited).

Marquess, then Duke of Kent
Henry Grey (1671–1740) succeeded his father, Anthony Grey, as the 12th Earl of Kent in 1702. In 1706, he was elevated to Marquess of Kent, along with Earl of Harold and Viscount Goderich. In 1710 he was elevated once again as Duke of Kent, and following the death of his sons, Marquess Grey (1740) with a special remainder to his granddaughter. Henry had one son and five daughters with his first wife, Jemima Crew (d. 1728), and one son and one daughter with his second wife, Sophia Bentinck (d. 1741). By the time of Henry's death in 1740, both of his sons had died, Anthony (in 1723) and George (in 1733), leaving the Duke of Kent without a male heir. His granddaughter Lady Jemima Campbell would inherit two titles in her own right, Marchioness Grey and Baroness Lucas; but all Henry's other titles, particularly Duke of Kent, became extinct with his death.

Royal dukedom, 1799
On 23 April 1799 the double dukedom of Kent and Strathearn was given, with the earldom of Dublin, to King George III's fourth son, Prince Edward Augustus. Edward had only one legitimate child, a daughter, Princess Alexandrina Victoria (the future Queen Victoria). Upon Edward's death in 1820, the dukedom of Kent and Strathearn became extinct, as he had no legitimate male heir.

Royal earldom, 1866
The next creation of a title of Kent was not that of Duke or Marquess, but rather that of Earl, with the creation of Prince Alfred (1844–1900), the second son of Queen Victoria and Prince Albert, as Duke of Edinburgh, Earl of Ulster, and of Kent in 1866. The Duke of Edinburgh (who later became the reigning Duke of Saxe-Coburg-Gotha) had only one son, Prince Alfred, who would have inherited his father's titles had he not died before his father in 1899. With Prince Alfred's death in 1900, the earldom became extinct.

Royal dukedom, 1934
In 1934, Prince George (1902–1942), the fourth son of King George V of the United Kingdom and Queen Mary, was created Duke of Kent, Earl of St Andrews and Baron Downpatrick. Prince George had three children before his death in 1942: Prince Edward, Princess Alexandra, and Prince Michael. Prince Edward, upon his father's death, succeeded to his father's peerages.

The current Duke of Kent has two sons. King George V's Letters Patent of 30 November 1917 restricted the style Royal Highness and the titular dignity of Prince to the sons of the Sovereign, the male line grandsons of the Sovereign, and the eldest living son of the eldest son of the Prince of Wales. Great-grandchildren of the Sovereign in the male line enjoy the courtesy titles of the children of dukes. Therefore, the heir-apparent to the dukedom of Kent is George, Earl of St. Andrews (b. 1962).  Lord St. Andrews married in 1988, and has three children. His son Lord Downpatrick (b. 1988) is second in line to his grandfather's peerages. When Lord St. Andrews succeeds, the dukedom will cease to be a Royal dukedom; as a great-grandson of a sovereign he will be styled His Grace The Duke of Kent. After Lord St. Andrews and Lord Downpatrick, the current duke's younger son Lord Nicholas Windsor is in remainder to the dukedom, as are the current duke's brother, Prince Michael of Kent, and his son, Lord Frederick Windsor.

Duties

The current Duke of Kent carries out numerous duties for the monarchy, both military and civil.  As a Freemason, he is the Grand Master of the United Grand Lodge of England, and has served as the President of The Scout Association of the United Kingdom since 1975 and of the Royal Institution. He has performed a number of state visits to Commonwealth nations on behalf of the Queen. He has also acted as Counsellor of State. His Royal Highness is the Grand Prior (or Grand Master) of the Order of St Michael and St George. He holds numerous other appointments in the military. The Duke of Kent has been the patron of Endeavour, a national youth organisation, for 29 years.

Coat of arms
The coat of arms anciently associated with Kent is that of a rampant white horse upon a red field. This is primarily associated with the Kingdom of Kent and possibly the earldom as well. Today, this is seen on the Council of Kent's arms and flag. As a direct descendant of Queen Victoria, this is not the coat of arms of the present Duke of Kent. The coat of arms of the Duke of Kent consists of the following:

 Arms: those of the Royal Arms, differenced by a label of five points argent (silver, often depicted as white), the points charged with an anchor azure (blue) and a cross gules (red) alternately.
 Crest: On a coronet of four crosses-patées alternated with four strawberry leaves a lion statant guardant or (gold), crowned with the like coronet and differenced with a label as in the Arms.
 Supporters: The Royal Supporters differenced with the like coronet (as in the crest) and label as in the arms.

The standard of the Duke of Kent is a flag version of his arms. The personal badge of the present Duke of Kent is 'E' encircled by the garter of the Order of the Garter, surmounted by a Type IV Princes coronet as in the Crest.

Residence
The Duke and Duchess of Kent currently live at Wren House in the grounds of Kensington Palace, but their office is based at York House at St. James's Palace.

Dukes of Kent

First creation, 1710

| Henry Grey1710–1740also: Marquess Grey (1740), Marquess of Kent (1706), Earl of Kent (1465), Earl of Harold and Viscount Goderich (1706) and Baron Lucas of Crudwell (1663)
| 
| 1671
| (1) Hon. Jemima Crew1695 10 children (2) Lady Sophia Bentinck24 March 17292 children
| 1740
|-
|}

Second creation, 1934

| Prince GeorgeHouse of Windsor1934–1942also: Earl of St Andrews and Baron Downpatrick (1934)
| 
| 20 December 1902York Cottage, Sandringhamson of King George V and Queen Mary
| Princess Marina of Greece and Denmark29 November 19343 children
| 25 August 1942Dunbeathaged 39
|-
| Prince EdwardHouse of Windsor1942–presentalso: Earl of St Andrews and Baron Downpatrick (1934)
| 
| 9 October 1935Belgrave Square, Londonson of Prince George and Princess Marina
| Katharine Worsley8 June 19613 children
|  now  old
|-
|}

Line of succession

 Prince George, Duke of Kent (1902–1942)
 Prince Edward, Duke of Kent (born 1935) 
(1) George Windsor, Earl of St Andrews (b. 1962)
 (2) Edward Windsor, Lord Downpatrick (b. 1988)
 (3) Lord Nicholas Windsor (b. 1970)
 (4) Albert Louis Philip Edward Windsor (b. 2007)
 (5) Leopold Ernest Augustus Guelph Windsor (b. 2009)
 (6) Louis Arthur Nicholas Felix Windsor (b. 2014)
 (7)  Prince Michael of Kent (b. 1942)
 (8) Lord Frederick Windsor (b. 1979)

Family tree

See also
Duchess of Kent
British monarchy
Kent
Earls of Kent
Kingdom of Kent

References

External links
The Duke of Kent at the Royal Family website
Duke of Kent at the Royal Institution , Ri Channel video, 6 December 1985

Dukedoms in the Peerage of the United Kingdom
1710 establishments in Great Britain
1934 establishments in the United Kingdom
Noble titles created in 1710
Noble titles created in 1934